

Seeds
Champion seeds are indicated in bold text while text in italics indicates the round in which those seeds were eliminated. The top four seeded teams received byes into the second round.

Draw

Finals

Top half

Bottom half

External links
 1990 ATP German Open Doubles draw

Doubles